The 2015 Judo Grand Prix Samsun was held in Samsun, Turkey from 27 to 29 March 2015.

Medal summary

Men's events

Women's events

Source Results

Medal table

References

External links
 

2015 IJF World Tour
2015 Judo Grand Prix
2015
Grand Prix 2015
Judo
March 2015 sports events in Asia
March 2015 events in Turkey